Calabrese may refer to:

 Any person, thing or concept of or from Calabria, a region in southern Italy, including:
The various regional languages of Calabria

In agriculture
 The Apulo-Calabrese breed of pig
 Calabrian wine
 Calabrese, an alternative name for the Italian wine grape Nero d'Avola
 Calabrese, an alternative name for the Italian wine grape Sangiovese
 Calabrese, an alternative name for the Italian wine grape Canaiolo
 Calabrese, a particular type of broccoli, in the United Kingdom
 The Calabrese horse

Other uses 
 Calabrese (surname)
 Calabresi (surname)
 Calabrese (band), American rock band

See also 
 Calabresella
 Calabrian (disambiguation)
 Calabro (disambiguation)